The Best of The Moody Blues is a compilation album by the British progressive rock band The Moody Blues, released on 23 September 1996. 

The album collects the band's greatest hits in both the UK and US, including their only UK No. 1 single, 1964's "Go Now", which marked the first time material by the original 1964–1966 line-up of the band, with vocalist/guitarist Denny Laine and bassist Clint Warwick, was included on an official Moody Blues compilation album. Laine and Warwick were replaced by Justin Hayward and John Lodge in 1966, both of whom would remain with the band for the rest of its history.

The album was re-released in both the UK and US on 28 January 1997, only just over four months after it's original release, with new artwork. In the UK this re-release also carried a slightly different title, The Very Best of The Moody Blues, though the original title was kept in the US. In the UK the 1996 release was on Deram Records, which since 1979 had become exclusively a reissue label, while the 1997 release was on PolyGram. In the US both the 1996 and 1997 releases were on Polydor Records. The album was re-released again in the UK in 2000, this time by Universal Music Group.

Track listing

All tracks performed by The Moody Blues except track 10 performed by Justin Hayward and John Lodge (with backing by 10cc) and track 12 performed by Justin Hayward and Jeff Wayne

All songs written by Justin Hayward except track 1 by Larry Banks and Milton Bennett, tracks 4, 8, 9 and 11 by John Lodge, track 12 by Jeff Wayne, Paul Vigrass and Gary Osborne and track 14 by Justin Hayward and John Lodge

Charts

Certifications

References

1996 greatest hits albums
The Moody Blues compilation albums
Polydor Records compilation albums